Mărașu is a commune located in Brăila County, Muntenia, Romania. It is composed of five villages: Băndoiu, Măgureni, Mărașu, Plopi and Țăcău. It formerly included Nedelcu village, now depopulated.

The Balta Mică a Brăilei Natural Park is partly situated on the administrative territory of the commune.

References

Communes in Brăila County
Localities in Muntenia